Teresa Dobija (born 9 October 1982 in Bielsko-Biała) is a Polish athlete specialising in the long jump. She competed at the 2009 World Championships placing tenth in the final.

She has personal bests of 6.78 metres outdoors (2011) and 6.50 metres indoors (2011).

Competition record

References

1982 births
Living people
Polish female long jumpers
Sportspeople from Bielsko-Biała
Competitors at the 2009 Summer Universiade